East Lake Park, also known as Donghu Park, is a public urban park in Shenzhen, Guangdong, China. The park was opened in 1966, incorporating recreational activities and tourism. In April 1991 the park was designated as a "provincial-level scenic spot" by the Guangdong Provincial People's Government.

History
Construction of the East Lake Park started in 1961 and was known as Reservoir Park on its completion(), and was officially opened to the public in 1966.

Parks

The Garden has more than eleven scenic areas, such as: 
 Ornamental Woody Plants Garden 
 Arboretum
 Old and Historical Trees Area
 Bonsai world
 Rhododendron Sculpture Garden
 Landscape Forest
 Zoo
 Playground
 Fishing Area
 Tennis Court
 Gateball Area

Tourist attractions

The  man-made lake is divided into two parts. There are three islands in the lake. A stone arch bridge connects the islands.

Transportation
 Take bus No. 3 or 17 to Reservoir Central Station.
 Take bus No. 64 or 320 to East Lake Passenger Station.
 Take bus No. 29, 106, 208, 211, 300, 308, 336, 351, 365 or 372 to Reservoir Station.

See also
 List of parks in Shenzhen

References

External links

Botanical gardens in Guangdong
Parks in Shenzhen